Jean Bayard (23 October 1897 in Toulouse – 11 March 1995) was a French rugby union player who competed in the 1924 Summer Olympics. In 1924 he won the silver medal as member of the French team.

References

External links
Jean Bayard's profile at databaseOlympics
Jean Bayard's profile at SportsReference.com

1897 births
1995 deaths
Rugby union players from Toulouse
French rugby union players
Olympic rugby union players of France
Rugby union players at the 1924 Summer Olympics
Olympic silver medalists for France
France international rugby union players
Medalists at the 1924 Summer Olympics